John Horewode (died 1417) of Wells, Somerset, was an English politician.

Family
He married Margery and they had one son, Thomas, also an MP.

Career
He was a Member (MP) of the Parliament of England for Wells in February and May 1413.

References

14th-century births
1417 deaths
English MPs February 1413
People from Wells, Somerset
English MPs May 1413